Arnes is a municipality in the comarca of la Terra Alta in Catalonia, Spain.

Main sights
The most noteworthy building of this town is the Town Hall, an example of Catalan Renaissance art. It was built in 1584 by Joan Vilabona of Queretes in nearby Matarranya.

There is a raised area with benches close to the church shaded by mulberry trees with views over the Roques de Benet, among other mountains of the Ports de Tortosa-Beseit. Local people like to sit there in the afternoon enjoying the landscape.

References

External links 

 Pàgina web de l'Ajuntament
 Government data pages 

Municipalities in Terra Alta (comarca)